Lepidodactylus bisakol, or the Bicol Scaly-toed Gecko is a species of gecko. It is endemic to the Philippines.

References

Lepidodactylus
Reptiles described in 2021